C. europaea may refer to:
 Camillina europaea, a spider species found in Italy
 Caralluma europaea, a plant species in the genus Caralluma
 Cuscuta europaea, the greater dodder, a parasitic plant species native to Europe

See also